Keith Warren was a 19-year-old African-American teenager who was found hanging from a tree in Silver Spring, Maryland, in 1986. His death was ruled a suicide by police. In the following decades Warren's family and various advocates highlighted what they felt were failures in the police's investigation and called for the case to be reopened.

Warren's case was the subject of the 2022 docuseries, Uprooted.

References

1986 suicides
Suicides by hanging in Maryland
Silver Spring, Maryland
African-American history of Montgomery County, Maryland
African-American-related controversies